Marion Todd Peat Sr. (born May 20, 1964) is a former professional American football offensive lineman in the National Football League. He played six seasons for the St. Louis/Phoenix Cardinals (1987–1989) and the Los Angeles Raiders (1990, 1992–1993). Peat played for Frankfurt Galaxy in the World League of American Football (1995).

He has seven children. His oldest son, Todd, played defensive tackle for Nebraska, Eastern Arizona College, and Texas A&M–Commerce. Andrus was picked 13th overall in the 2015 NFL Draft by the New Orleans Saints. Cassius played college football for Scottsdale Community College. His daughter Leilani plays women's college basketball for the Seattle Redhawks.

References

1964 births
Living people
Sportspeople from Champaign, Illinois
Players of American football from Illinois
American football offensive tackles
American football offensive guards
Northern Illinois Huskies football players
St. Louis Cardinals (football) players
Phoenix Cardinals players
Los Angeles Raiders players
Frankfurt Galaxy players
Ed Block Courage Award recipients